Walter Heidenfels (born 1961 in Tönisvorst, West Germany) is a German industrial designer and one of the key principles of TEAMS Design GmbH in Hamburg, Germany.  He is known for his work for companies such as Schmersal and Busch-Jaeger. Heidenfels has been instrumental in extending long term relationships with companies such as Robert Bosch GmbH and Still Forklift (KION Group).  He specializes in 3D CAD, such as Rhinoceros 3D, Pro/Engineer, SolidWorks and Unigraphics to bring his designs to life.

History
Heidenfels studied industrial design at the University of Wuppertal in Germany. From 1998 to 2002, Heidenfels and his associate partner, Danos Papadopoulos, ran an office called Wings of Design in Wuppertal.  Heidenfels opened the Hamburg office of TEAMS Design with Ulrich Warth in 2002.  Today, he continues to contribute to the design culture at TEAMS Design.  Heidenfels is also regularly asked to contribute articles and lecture at neighboring universities.

Personal life
Heidenfels currently resides in Hamburg, Germany.  He has been a member of the VDID since 1984.

Design awards
Heidenfels has collected over 10 awards during his career.  Here are some of the awards:

1988 
Governor of Osaka Prefecture Prize, Japan Design Foundation, Solar Drinking Water Generator

1992
Red Dot Design Award - Alpermann + Velte GmbH PHILIPS IHP 6809 Video-Editor

1995 
iF Award - TES TAPPERT Twin Rack Electronic Rack System
North Rhine-Westphalia Designpreiz - TES TAPPERT Twin Rack Electronic Rack System

1996 
iF Award - K.A. Schmersal GmbH AZ17 / AZM 170 Safety Switch

1998 
iF Awards 
K.A. Schmersal B.A.P. Positioning System for Lift Cabins
Hailo-Werk Trans Sorter / Mobile Clothes Sorter 

1998  
Red Dot Design Award
K.A. Schmersal B.A.P. Positioning System for Lift Cabins
K.A. Schmersal AV 20/21 Safety Interlock

2004
Red Dot Design Award
Busch-Jaeger Elektro Ocean Waterproof Fittings Range

References

Publications
Zec, Peter,(1992). Design Innovationen Jahrbuch, Design Zentrum Nordrhein Westfalen, Essen,  
Zec, Peter, (1995). Designpreis des Landes Nordrhein-Westfalen, red dot edition, Essen, 
Zec, Peter, (1998). Design Innovationen Jahrbuch, Design Zentrum Nordrhein Westfalen, Essen, 
Princeton Architectural Press, (2002/2003).  Designer Profile 2002/2003 - Volume 1: Industrial and exhibition design, Birkhauser Basel, 
Zec, Peter, (2001). Who’s Who in German Design, Birkhauser Basel, 
Design Zentrum, (1998/99). Ranking:Design 1998/99, Birkhauser Basel, 
(1998). form spezial Nr. 2: Transportation Design, Birkhauser Basel,

Patents
 patents 1
 patents 2
 patents 3

External links
• TEAMS Design

1961 births
Living people
German industrial designers
Product management
Product development
People from Viersen (district)
University of Wuppertal alumni